The Eurasian Boxing Parliament is a professional boxing organisation that sanctions bouts in various countries within Eurasia.

Affiliations 

The Eurasian Boxing Parliament is affiliated with and a member organization of the International Boxing Federation (IBF).

Belt 

The EBP belt is created by using the latest computerized laser technology with an external 24-carat gold-layered coating.

Current champions

Former champions

Sergey Kovalev - former EBP (Super) light-heavyweight champion
Yury Kashinsky - former EBP cruiserweight champion
Umar Salamov - former EBP light-heavyweight champion
Maksim Vlasov - former EBP light-heavyweight champion
Aram Amirkhanyan - former EBP super-welterweight champion
Georgi Chelokhsaev - former EBP super-lightweight champion
Eduard Troyanovsky - former EBP super-lightweight champion
Mark Urvanov - former EBP super-featherweight champion

Members 

Afghanistan
Albania
Armenia
Austria
Belarus
Belgium
Bosnia and Herzegovina
Croatia
Czech Republic
East Timor
Estonia
Georgia
Germany
India
Indonesia
Iran
Kazakhstan
Kyrgyzstan
Laos
Latvia
Lithuania
Macedonia
Moldova
Mongolia
Netherlands
Pakistan
Philippines
Poland
Russia
Serbia
Slovenia
South Korea
Sri Lanka
Switzerland
Tajikistan
Thailand
Turkey
Uzbekistan
Vietnam

References

External links

Professional boxing organizations
International sports organizations